Wooords is an iOS game developed by New Zealand studio Stray Robot Games and released on July 21, 2011.

Reception

The game received critical acclaim, garnering a rating of 90/100 on Metacritic, based on 4 critic reviews.

TouchArcade said "Even though you might already have a ton of similar word games on your device, the clever refrigerator magnet-powered gameplay feels surprisingly fresh, and makes the UI used in previously released word games flat out seem archaic in comparison." 148Apps wrote "An excellent effort. It's neat, simple, frantic, and very, very addictive, and a suitable new home for my words-based superpower". Pocket Gamer UK said "Wooords's ease of use and challenging puzzles ensure that it's a must have for word buffs and puzzle fans of all abilities." AppSafari said "Wooords has an adorable interface that does its best to act like magnets on a fridge, complete with a rainbow assortment of letters and clacking drag-and-drop sounds."

References

2011 video games
Android (operating system) games
IOS games
GameClub games
Word puzzle video games
Video games developed in New Zealand